Oenothera elata is a species of Oenothera known by the common name Hooker's evening primrose or tall evening primrose. Subspecies include hookeri, hirsutissima, longisima, jamesii, villosa and elata. It is native to much of western and central North America. The plants are quite tall, especially the hookeri subspecies, native to California, which can reach about 1.8 meters (6 feet) height.

Description
The stout, usually reddish stem has many long, narrow leaves, above a basal rosette. At its top is a large, open cluster of 2- to 4-inch wide yellow flowers with 4 large petals and protruding yellow stamens and 4-branched pistil, often covered in sticky pollen. The fragrant flowers open at dusk and wilt the next morning, turning orange or red.

Uses
The Zuni people apply a poultice of the powdered flower of the hookeri subspecies and saliva at night to swellings.

Gallery

References

Further reading

External links
Calflora Database: Oenothera elata (Hooker's evening primrose)
Jepson Manual eFlora treatment of Oenothera elata
Photo gallery

elata
Night-blooming plants
Flora of the Northwestern United States
Flora of the Southwestern United States
Flora of the South-Central United States
Flora of Northwestern Mexico
Flora of California
Natural history of the California chaparral and woodlands
Plants used in traditional Native American medicine
Taxa named by Carl Sigismund Kunth
Flora without expected TNC conservation status